Argo is a 2012 political thriller directed by Ben Affleck, and produced by Grant Heslov, Affleck and George Clooney. The screenplay by Chris Terrio was adapted from sections of the Central Intelligence Agency (CIA) operative Tony Mendez's memoir The Master of Disguise: My Secret Life in the CIA, and the 2007 Wired article The Great Escape by Joshuah Bearman on the Canadian Caper. The film stars Affleck as Mendez, who attempts to rescue six United States diplomats from Tehran, Iran, during the 1979–81 Iran hostage crisis by pretending that they are part of a film crew scouting the country for the filming of a fictitious science-fiction film, Argo. Bryan Cranston, Alan Arkin, and John Goodman feature in supporting roles.

After successful screenings at the Telluride Film Festival, and the Toronto International Film Festival, Warner Bros. gave the film a wide release in the United States at more than 3,200 theaters on October 12, 2012. Argo grossed over $232 million at the worldwide box office on a production budget of $44.5 million. Rotten Tomatoes, a review aggregator, surveyed 348 reviews and judged 96% to be positive.

Argo garnered awards and nominations in a variety of categories, with particular praise for its direction, screenplay, and Arkin and Goodman's performance. At the 85th Academy Awards, the film received seven nominations, including Best Picture, and Best Supporting Actor for Arkin, and went on to win three awards: Best Picture, Best Adapted Screenplay for Terrio, and Best Film Editing for William Goldenberg. It became only the fourth film in Oscar history to win Best Picture without a directing nomination. Argo earned five nominations at the 70th Golden Globe Awards, winning for Best Motion Picture – Drama, and Best Director for Affleck. At the 66th British Academy Film Awards, the film received seven nominations, and won for Best Film and Best Direction.

At the 24th Producers Guild of America Awards, Argo won for Best Theatrical Motion Picture. Affleck received the Outstanding Directing – Feature Film Award from the Directors Guild of America. The cast garnered the Screen Actors Guild Award for Outstanding Performance by a Cast in a Motion Picture and Terrio's screenplay won the Writers Guild of America Award for Best Adapted Screenplay. Both the American Film Institute and the National Board of Review included the film in their annual listing of the top ten films of 2012.

Accolades

See also
 2012 in film

Notes

References

External links
 

Lists of accolades by film